Emilie Mechelin (8 April 1838 — 22 December 1917) was a Finnish operatic soprano and pedagogue, notable among other things for being the first singing teacher of the Helsinki School of Music (later to become Sibelius Academy).

Early life and education
Johanna Sofia Emilie Mechelin was born to an upper-class family in Hamina, in the Grand Duchy of Finland, as the eldest of five children of Valtioneuvos ('Councillor of State') Gustaf Johan Mechelin and Amanda  Sagulin. One of Emilie's brothers is Leo Mechelin, who later became a notable economist, academic and statesman.

Emilie Mechelin trained in Paris in 1865-67 and 1869-70 under leading pedagogues of the time, including Pauline Viardot. In 1873-74 she was taught in Stockholm by Signe Hebbe. She also studied for a time in Germany.

Career
She also performed at the Royal Dramatic Theatre in Stockholm, as well as touring extensively in Finland and Scandinavia.

Mechelin taught singing from early on, with her pupils including the likes of Emma Engdahl-Jägerskiöld, Emmy Achté and Ida Basilier-Magelssen.

In 1882, Mechelin was appointed the first teacher of voice at the Helsinki School of Music (Helsingin Musiikkiopisto), which post she held until 1885, when she moved to Kristiania (now Oslo) and later to Stockholm to continue her teaching career.

In the latter part of her career, Mechelin gave up singing almost entirely, dedicating herself instead to giving private tuition. She did still occasionally perform at concerts until the age 60, by which time her voice had changed to mezzo-soprano.

References

Further reading
Repository of contemporary newspaper coverage of Emilie Mechelin at Finnish National Library (digitised; in Finnish and Swedish)

19th-century Finnish women opera singers
Finnish sopranos
People from Hamina
1838 births
1917 deaths